Almahdi Rural District is in Mohammadyar District of Naqadeh County, West Azerbaijan province, Iran. At the National Census of 2006, its population was 8,542 in 1,763 households. There were 8,278 inhabitants in 2,278 households at the following census of 2011. At the most recent census of 2016, the population of the rural district was 7,959 in 2,119 households. The largest of its 22 villages was Farrokhzad, with 887 people.

References 

Naqadeh County

Rural Districts of West Azerbaijan Province

Populated places in West Azerbaijan Province

Populated places in Naqadeh County